Bryan Murphy is a former Gaelic football goalkeeper at senior level for the Kerry and Dublin county teams. He won an All-Ireland Minor Football Championship with Kerry in 1994. County Dublin and joined Naomh Barróg in Kilbarrack. He received a Leinster Senior Football Championship medal for Dublin in 2002 as a member of the panel, but was yet to make his debut in the championship. He made his National League debut against Offaly in 2002, and his championship debut in 2003 against Armagh.

References

External links
 
 
 
 
 
 

Year of birth missing (living people)
Living people
Beaufort Gaelic footballers
Gaelic football goalkeepers
Dublin inter-county Gaelic footballers
Kerry inter-county Gaelic footballers
Naomh Barróg Gaelic footballers